Estonia is an Estonian society which organises theatrical and musical activities. It initially existed from 1865 until 1940, and was re-established in 1990.

The society participated in the Estonian Song Festival in 1869, and the Estonia Theatre was established on its initiative in 1906.

The Estonian Song Festivals in 1896 and in 1910 were organised by this society along with another society called Lootus.

References

Further reading
 Natuke Eesti lõbuseltsidest, Eesti Postimees ehk Näddalaleht : ma- ja linnarahvale, nr. 33, 15. August 1884, lk. 1
 Aastapidu (20. a. juubel), Eesti Postimees ehk Näddalaleht : ma- ja linnarahvale, nr. 45, 6. November 1885, lk. 2
 "Estonia" minevikust. Ärakirjad "Estonia" prototolliraamatutest. Seltsi asutamine., Päewaleht, nr. 255, 6 November 1913, lk. 5
 Wiiskümmend aastat "Estonia" elust., Päewaleht, nr. 233, 10. oktoober 1915, lk. 5
 "Estoonia seltsi 60-aastase tegewuse juubel, Kaja, nr. 148, 16. juuni 1925 tr. 1, lk. 7
 "Estoonia" esimesed eluaastad. Estoonia kuuskümmend aastat andmetel., Muusikaleht, Nr. 11, November 1925, lk. 166-170
 Joh. Lepa: "Estonia" selts 1865 - 1925. 1.", Postimees, nr. 315, 20. november 1925, lk. 4 
 Joh. Lepa: "Estonia" selts 1865 - 1925. 2.", Postimees, nr. 316, 21. november 1925, lk. 4
 Joh. Lepa: "Estonia" selts 1865 - 1925. 3.", Postimees, nr. 317, 22. november 1925, lk. 2
 Joh. Lepa: "Estonia" selts 1865 - 1925. 4.", Postimees, nr. 319, 24. november 1925, lk. 4
 Mälestused "Estoonia" algupäevilt. Praegu elusoleva kaasaegse [Peeter Veros (1851-1832)] jutustus., Kaja, nr. 283, 20 November 1925, lk. 5
 "Estoonia seltsi algusaastad", Vaba Maa, 21. November 1925, lk. 6
 "Laulo ja mängo" selts, Päewaleht, nr. 290, 20. oktoober 1935, lk. 6
 "Estonia 70. a. juubeli puhul", Noor-Eesti, eesti kirjanike selts; Tänapäev, kirjastus (Tartu), Tänapäev ; 8 1935–11,  lk. 295

Clubs and societies in Estonia
Culture in Tallinn